The eighth season of the American crime thriller television series The Blacklist premiered on November 13, 2020 and ended on June 23, 2021.

The series was created by Jon Bokenkamp, and continues to be produced by Davis Entertainment, Universal Television and Sony Pictures Television, and executive produced by Jon Bokenkamp, John Davis, John Eisendrath, John Fox and Joe Carnahan. This is the last season to star Megan Boone.

Premise
The eighth season follows Elizabeth Keen and her mother Katarina Rostova in their attempts to take down Reddington, who eventually kills Rostova. Elizabeth then goes on a vengeful crusade against Reddington, going rogue from the FBI and gathering her own resources and people to destroy him. She enters into an alliance with a powerful, dangerous criminal Neville Townsend, the author of Townsend's Directive. This alliance however, puts Elizabeth, Reddington, the FBI task force, and her attempts to discover more about her and Reddington's past in great jeopardy.

Cast

Main
 James Spader as Raymond "Red" Reddington
 Megan Boone as Elizabeth Keen
 Diego Klattenhoff as Donald Ressler
 Harry Lennix as Harold Cooper
 Amir Arison as Aram Mojtabai
 Laura Sohn as Alina Park
 Hisham Tawfiq as Dembe Zuma

Recurring
 Laila Robins as Katarina Rostova/Tatiana Petrova
 Reg Rogers as Neville Townsend
 Ron Raines as Dominic
Wilkinson
 Ginger Mason as Agnes Keen
 Kecia Lewis as Esi Jackson
 Drew Gehling as Skip Hadley
 Deirdre Lovejoy as Cynthia Panabaker
 LaChanze as Anne Foster
 David E. Harrison as Ivan Stepanov
 Lukas Hassel as Vandyke
 Christopher Gurr as Godwin Page
 Rana Roy as Priya Laghari

Guest stars
 Huey Lewis as himself
 Laverne Cox as Dr. Laken Perillos
 Susan Blommaert as Mr. Kaplan
 Lotte Verbeek as younger Katarina Rostova
 Dikran Tulaine as Maxwell Ruddiger
 Valarie Pettiford as Charlene Cooper
 Fisher Stevens as Marvin Gerard
 Brett Cullen as Frank Bloom / Ilya Kozlov
 Jonathan Holtzman as Chuck
 Dane West as The Storyteller

Tribute to
 Brian Dennehy as Dominic Wilkinson
 Clark Middleton as Glen Carter
 Tobias Core (unknown role)

Episodes

Production

Casting
 Laura Sohn, who had a recurring role in the previous season as Alina Park, had become a series regular.
 Ron Raines replaced Brian Dennehy as Dominic Wilkinson, due to the death of the latter prior to production.
 Clark Middleton, who portrayed Glen Carter, Reddington's tracker, died in October 2020.
 Megan Boone left the series after eight seasons.

Filming
Production for the eighth season began in September 2020 with full safety protocols in place amid the COVID-19 pandemic.

Departure of Jon Bokenkamp
Series creator Jon Bokenkamp announced in June 2021 to leave the series after eight seasons to move on new projects.

Ratings

References

External links
 
 

2020 American television seasons
2021 American television seasons
8
Television productions postponed due to the COVID-19 pandemic